Jirawat Makarom (born February 7, 1986) is a Thai retired professional footballer who played as a midfielder.

Club career

Thai Port
Jirawat has established himself as a regular member of the Thai Port FC midfield in the 2009 season. He has earned a reputation as a free kick specialist with 6 of his 7 goals from set plays in the 2009 season. He was named man of the match in the 2009 Thai FA Cup Final, and was also given the 2009 Most promising player award by Thai Port FC. He played and scored a goal in the 2010 Thai League Cup final and won a winner's medal after Thai Port defeated Buriram PEA F.C. 2–1.

Buriram FC

Jirawat joined Buriram FC in 2011 and won the 2011 Thai Division 1 League with the team.

Buriram United

He joined Buriram PEA F.C. (currently Buriram United) in 2012. In the 2012 AFC Champions League he scored his debut goal for Buriram PEA F.C. against Kashiwa Reysol.

Jirawat played in the 2013 AFC Champions League with Buriram United. His corner assisted Osmar in the 2013 AFC Champions League against Esteghlal, and his free kick that assisted Ekkachai Sumrei against Bunyodkor. Jirawat scored against Bangkok United FC in October which secured Buriram United's 2013 Thai Premier League title.

International career

Jirawat debuted for the national team in the 2012 King's Cup. He came in as a substitute in an unofficial debut against South Korea in the 2012 King's Cup. He came in as a substitute for Sumanya Purisai, in an official debut against Norway. On February 29, 2012, Jirawat started for Thailand against Oman in the 2014 World Cup qualification.

Style of Play

Jirawat is known for his deadly free kicks and corners which could become goals or allow other players to score. Jirawat's passes are accurate, and had assisted many players. Jirawat could play as a defensive, attacking, or center midfielder.

International

Honours

Club
Thai Port 
 Thai FA Cup (1): 2009
 Thai League Cup (1): 2010

Buriram 
 Thai Division 1 League (1): 2011

Buriram United
 Thai Premier League (1): 2013
 Thai FA Cup (2): 2012, 2013
 Thai League Cup (2): 2012, 2013
 Kor Royal Cup (2): 2013, 2014

References

External links

1986 births
Living people
Jirawat Makarom
Jirawat Makarom
Association football midfielders
Jirawat Makarom
Jirawat Makarom
Jirawat Makarom
Jirawat Makarom
Jirawat Makarom
Jirawat Makarom
Jirawat Makarom
Jirawat Makarom
Jirawat Makarom